Ernest Henry Alton (21 September 1873 – 18 February 1952) was an Irish university professor and an independent Teachta Dála (TD) and Senator.

Born near Mullingar, County Westmeath, Alton attended The High School in Dublin. He graduated from Trinity College Dublin in 1896 with honours in classics and philosophy, having been elected a Scholar of the college in 1894. He won the Berkeley medal (in Greek) and the Wray prize (in philosophy), and was awarded a studentship (postgraduate scholarship) on his final results. He a member of Trinity College's Officer Training Corps and saw action during the 1916 Easter Rising. For helping to defend the college from the Irish Volunteers who occupied the nearby Westland Row station, he was awarded the Military Cross. He was elected to the Royal Irish Academy in 1912, and served as its vice-president from 1942 to 1944, and from 1946 to 1947.

He was elected to the House of Commons of Southern Ireland at the 1921 elections, representing the Dublin University constituency as an Independent Unionist, he did not participate in the Second Dáil. He was re-elected for the same constituency at the 1922 general election and became a member of the Third Dáil. He was re-elected at the next five general elections until the Dublin University Dáil Éireann constituency was abolished in 1937. He served as a member of the 2nd Seanad and the 3rd Seanad representing the Seanad Éireann Dublin University constituency until 1943 when he retired from politics.

He was professor of Latin at Trinity College Dublin from 1921 to 1942, and was Provost from 1942 until his death in 1952. During his time as provost, the college made the first successful application for state funding. He married Ethel Hughes-Hunter in 1915, and they had 2 sons and a daughter.

His nephew Bryan Alton was a member of Seanad Éireann from 1965 to 1973.

References

External links
Biography from Trinity College Dublin

1873 births
1952 deaths
Alumni of Trinity College Dublin
Independent members of Seanad Éireann
Independent TDs
Members of the Royal Irish Academy
Members of Seanad Éireann for Dublin University
Members of the 2nd Dáil
Members of the 3rd Dáil
Members of the 4th Dáil
Members of the 5th Dáil
Members of the 6th Dáil
Members of the 7th Dáil
Members of the 8th Dáil
Members of the 2nd Seanad
Members of the 3rd Seanad
People educated at The High School, Dublin
People of the Irish Civil War (Pro-Treaty side)
Politicians from County Westmeath
Provosts of Trinity College Dublin
Scholars of Trinity College Dublin
Teachtaí Dála for Dublin University
Recipients of the Military Cross